Gothic is a 2001 fantasy-themed action role-playing video game for Microsoft Windows developed by the German company Piranha Bytes.

Gothic was well received by critics. Reviewers credited the game for its story, complex interaction with other in-game characters, and graphics, but criticized it for the difficult control scheme and high system requirements. It was the first game of the game series of the same name.

On 13 December 2019, a playable prototype demo of a remake was released by THQ Nordic. The demo can be downloaded on Steam by users that own a game from Piranha Bytes. In 2020 upon the feedback on the demo, THQ Nordic decided to let the Gothic remake be produced.

Gameplay 
The main character must complete quests and slay wild animals and monsters to earn skill points, which are used to increase basic attributes, improve skills, and learn trades. They are spent by finding the appropriate teacher. Several skills have only one "level" (Sneaking, Acrobatics), while the fighting skills (one-handed weapons, two-handed weapons, bows and crossbows) have two proficiency levels. If the Hero chooses to be a Mage (or joins the Swamp Camp), he will be able to learn Circles of Magic; of which there are 6. The main attributes are increased in 1 or 5 point increments, starting at 10 and capping off at 100. The cap can be surpassed with the use of potions.

The game places a special focus on the interactivity of the environment. For example, hunting wild animals can earn the player raw meat. This heals damage and can be sold. However, by using a stove or frying pan, the player may also choose to turn this into grilled meat, which heals much more effectively. Similarly, most of the activities other characters can be seen doing (playing musical instruments, stirring soup pots, urinating etc.) can be done by the main character as well (although with the exception of forging weapons these activities have little bearing on the game).

The player can choose which camp to join, although quests get increasingly linear and the distinctions between different factions wane in the latter parts of the game. The major difference is that Swamp Camp members cannot become mages, because they are limited to four magic circles (out of six). However, they gain access to magic earlier.

Synopsis

Setting 
The game takes place in a medieval fantasy realm in which humans are fighting a losing war against the Orcs, a humanoid race. In order to fight back, the king needs to extract magical ore from mines, which can be used to forge more powerful weapons. Therefore he decides to send every man who has committed a crime to the ore mines.

To prevent the convicts from escaping he orders his 12 most powerful magicians to erect a magical dome over the mining colony. However, the Barrier goes out of control and grows large enough to cover the entire valley, trapping the magicians inside, and giving the convicts a chance to kill the distracted guards and take control over the colony. The king is thus forced to come to an agreement with the prisoners, trading goods for ore.

Soon after, the convicts separate into three different groups: the Old Camp which controls trading with the king, the New Camp which refuses to trade the ore they mine, and instead plan to use its magical power to explode the Barrier, and the Brotherhood, whose members believe in a god called the Sleeper which will help them escape from the colony. The magicians that created the Barrier also divided; they formed the Fire Mages, who joined the Old Camp, and the Water Mages, who joined the New Camp.

Plot 
The player takes control of an unnamed prisoner who has just been thrown inside the mining colony. The exposition does not specify the crime for which he was convicted prior to the games' events. Before being sent in, the player receives a letter which he is tasked to deliver to the Order of the Magicians of Fire, which is stationed inside of the Old Camp. After getting the chance to talk with the magicians, the protagonist learns that Xardas, the head of the Fire Mages who is supposed to receive the letter, deserted in order to study black magic.

After joining one of the three camps, the protagonist ends up aiding the Sect Camp prepare the invocation of their god, the Sleeper, which they believe will show them the way to escape the colony. During the ritual the members have a vague vision and Y'Berion, the leader of the Brotherhood who performed the ritual, collapses after getting in contact with the Sleeper. In the vision, the sect members are shown the way to an old Orc cemetery. A guru and a few templars, together with the hero, set off towards the indicated place. Once there, however, the templars die fighting the Orcs they meet, and only the guru and the protagonist survive. After searching the entire underground complex the two fail to find anything. The guru then goes insane and starts accusing the hero that it is because of him that the Sleeper refuses to reveal himself, and attempts to kill the protagonist.

After defeating the mad guru, the hero returns to the camp of the Brotherhood where he finds Y'Berion still weakened after the ritual. Despite efforts to help him recover, Y'Berion soon dies. Before dying, however, he warns the rest of the camp about the true, evil, nature of the god they thought was leading them on the path to freedom, and places his hopes on the escape plan of the Water Mages from the New Camp to blow up the Barrier using the power of the magical ore.

Bearing important information about the recent events in the Sect Camp, the player is given permission to see the Water Mages, who ask for help with their escape plan. After the hero acquires all the needed artifacts with the help of four convicts he has befriended, the Water Mages now need the help of the Fire Mages to channel the magical energy. However, the protagonist finds out the Old Camp's gates have been closed after their ore mine collapsed. Fearful that this incident might deprive him of his power, the leader of the Old Camp sent his men to take control of the New Camp's mine and killed the Fire Mages who were protesting against his action; only Milten, the youngest of the magicians, managed to escape.

Having no other option left, the Water Mages send the hero to ask for Xardas, the magician who deserted the Fire Mages, to help them. However, Xardas refuses to help the Magicians of Water and thinks that their plan will not succeed. He instead tells the protagonist that during his studies he learned that the Sleeper was summoned by the Orcs in order to help them against their enemies and that the demon is in a temple deep underneath the Orc city. With the help of Xardas, the player manages to enter the Sleeper's temple. Upon defeating the demon, the Barrier collapses and sets the prisoners of the colony free.

Development 
Piranha Bytes worked more than four years on the development of Gothics technology. The game engine was created completely in-house with a modified version later used for Gothic II. These are the only games to use this engine.

Marketing and release 
Gothic was first released on 15 March 2001 in Germany, Austria and Switzerland, published by Egmont Interactive. The European release date by THQ arrived on 30 October 2001, followed by the North American release by Xicat Interactive on 23 November 2001.

In February 2006, an international re-release was announced to prepare for Gothic 3 – which received much more attention from international media than the previous games.

In the course of the re-release, an English demo version was made available at the official website. The demo contains a part of the first chapter of the game.

In Germany and some other countries, Gothic is also available in a collector's edition, bundled with Gothic II and Gothic II: Night of the Raven, and Gothic – Fan Edition, including the official map of the Colony and a variety of extras.

Reception 

According to GameStar, Gothic failed to make an "international breakthrough" into sales markets beyond Germany, a characteristic it shared with Anno 1602.

The game received "generally favorable reviews" according to the review aggregation website Metacritic. IGN concluded that "Gothic is a solid role-playing experience" and Eurogamer said that it is a game that "developers should look to as an example of how a role-playing adventure should be done". GameSpot gave the game a slightly less positive review saying that despite Gothics achievements in terms of story and dialog, players might still be disappointed by its shallow character development and poor combat mechanics.

GameLive PC named Gothic the third-best role-playing game of 2001–2002 behind Dungeon Siege and The Elder Scrolls III: Morrowind. The editors of Computer Games Magazine nominated Gothic as the best role-playing game of 2001, but ultimately gave the award to Arcanum: Of Steamworks and Magick Obscura and Wizardry 8 (tie). It was also a runner-up for RPG Vault's 2001 "RPG of the Year" prize, which it lost again to Arcanum. However, it won in the publication's "Surprise of the Year" category; the editors called it "a very solid, enjoyable debut effort".

See also 
 Gothic (series)
 2001 in video gaming
Risen, a similar game by the same developer
Video gaming in Germany

References

External links 
 
 

2001 video games
Action role-playing video games
Gothic (series)
Role-playing video games
Video games about magic
Video games developed in Germany
Windows games
Windows-only games
THQ games
Orcs in popular culture
Single-player video games
Xicat Interactive games